

This is a list of the National Register of Historic Places listings in Meade County, South Dakota.

This is intended to be a complete list of the properties and districts on the National Register of Historic Places in Meade County, South Dakota, United States. The locations of National Register properties and districts for which the latitude and longitude coordinates are included below, may be seen in a map.

There are 32 properties and districts listed on the National Register in the county, including 1 National Historic Landmark.

Current listings

|}

Former listings

|}

See also

 List of National Historic Landmarks in South Dakota
 National Register of Historic Places listings in South Dakota

References

 
Meade County
Buildings and structures in Meade County, South Dakota